HMS Stag was a 32-gun  fifth-rate frigate of the Royal Navy, and was the first Royal Navy ship to bear this name.  She was ordered during the Seven Years' War, and saw service during that conflict and also during the American War of Independence.

History

Stag was brought into service in October 1758, under Captain Henry Angel. She cost £7,136 19s 8d to build, plus fitting-out costs of £4,370 15s 2d.She was reduced to a 28-gun sixth rate in 1777, but restored as a 32-gun fifth rate in 1779.

On 4 January 1782, Stag under the command of Captain Robert Palliser Cooper, captured the French privateer Anti-Briton. Anti-Briton was armed with twenty-two 6-pounder guns and had a crew of 104 men under the command of John Kelly. Cooper had received intelligence that a privateer cutter had taken several vessels in the channel between Ireland and Britain. As soon as the weather permitted, Cooper set sail and was fortunate enough to encounter and capture her. Cooper reported that he took great pleasure in capturing her as she was quite new and had done a great deal of mischief. Kelly had captured the cutter Hope in August 1781.

Then on 18 June Stag captured the French privateer cutter Victoire after an eleven-hour chase. Cooper had received intelligence on the 14th that two French privateers were cruising off Waterford. He immediately set off in pursuit and caught up with Victoire off Dungarvan. Victoire was armed with two 8-pounder and fourteen 6-pounder guns, six of which she threw overboard during the chase, and a crew of 91 men. Victoire was a new, copper-bottomed cutter, sixteen days out of Brest. The other French privateer, the cutter Eagle, of Dunkirk, was reportedly of the "same force" as Victoire, but had already left the area.

Fate
Stag was broken up in July 1783 at Deptford.

Citations and references
Citations

References
 
 Brian Lavery, The Ship of the Line – Volume 1: The development of the battlefleet 1650–1850. Conway Maritime Press, 2003. .
 Robert Gardiner, The First Frigates, Conway Maritime Press, London 1992. .
 David Lyon, The Sailing Navy List, Conway Maritime Press, London 1993. .
 

 

Ships built on the River Thames
1758 ships
Fifth-rate frigates of the Royal Navy
Sixth-rate frigates of the Royal Navy